Bulat Aqchulaqov is the Minister of Energy of Kazakhstan.

During the 'Dialogue Organization on Asian Cooperation' seminar held on 6 October 2006, Aqchulaqov said Kazakhstan has 4.8 billion tons of oil, 3.4 trillion cubic meters of gas, and 8 billion tons of oil in the Caspian Sea. Aqchulaqov expressed his belief that by 2010, Kazakhstan's oil output to 84 million tons and its gas output to 50 billion cubic meters.

References

Living people
1971 births